The 2010 Monaco GP2 round was a GP2 Series motor race held on May 14 and May 15, 2010 at the Circuit de Monaco in Monte Carlo, Monaco. It was the second race of the 2010 GP2 Season. The race was used to support the 2010 Monaco Grand Prix. GP2's feeder formula GP3 does not appear at this event, with Formula Renault 3.5 Series replacing it on the support bill.

Report

Free practice
Pastor Maldonado was fastest in free practice. This circuit is favorite for the Venezuelan, he won here in 2006 Formula Renault 3.5 Series, 2007 and 2009 GP2 Series. Maldonado was ahead of Sergio Pérez and Christian Vietoris by 0.441 seconds. Vladimir Arabadzhiev  missed his car in Saint Devote and crashed his left rear into the wall, later Max Chilton made same mistake at the same corner but he escaped on the track.

Qualifying
Dani Clos claimed the top spot in heavy rain conditions ahead of Sergio Pérez and practice’s fastest man Pastor Maldonado, who crashed into the wall four minutes before the end of the session. This pole was the first in Clos's GP2 career. Davide Valsecchi, who set seventh fastest time in qualifying got a five place grid penalty for his accident with Pastor Maldonado.

Feature Race
Sergio Pérez took his maiden GP2 race win in the feature race at Monaco. The Barwa Addax driver crossed the line 0.6s clear of Pastor Maldonado, although the margin did not reflect Pérez's dominance around the Monte Carlo streets. The Mexican had led by as much as 5.2s at some points of the race, although that was eroded by a safety car following a Ho-Pin Tung's heavy crash at the Swimming Pool on lap 16. Pérez stretched his lead back out to well over 2.0s after the restart, but while he backed off over the closing laps, he never allowed Maldonado to get close enough to attempt at a pass. The pair moved into the top two spots at the start after capitalising on a slow getaway by polesitter Dani Clos, although the Spaniard made up for it with a solid drive to third, giving him his third-straight point-scoring finish. ART's Jules Bianchi was fourth, the Frenchman making up a few spots with a well-timed pitstop, but he was forced to keep an eye on his mirrors due to some late-race pressure from Coloni's Alberto Valerio. It was a less fruitful morning for Bianchi's team-mate Sam Bird, who was on track for points until suffering a severe delay in the pits that dropped the Briton back in 15th. Giedo van der Garde was sixth after having early made one of the only passing moves of the race when he overtook DAMS' Jérôme d'Ambrosio, but the Belgian had the last laugh when he crossed the line in eighth behind Luiz Razia, giving himself pole for tomorrow's sprint race. In typical Monaco fashion there were a few drivers whose race ended at the first corner. Max Chilton removed himself from the race by sailing into the back of Davide Valsecchi, forcing Valsecchi into the pits for repairs to his rear wing, while Trident's Adrian Zaugg was also hit from behind and forced to retire. Valsecchi got back out, only to later tag the wall and bend his suspension, forcing him to park. Having already lost Chilton at the first corner, Ocean Racing had to wait just one more lap before it could begin packing up after Fabio Leimer crashed at Mirabeau, and Coloni's Vladimir Arabadzhiev was also forced to retire with accident damage after a brush with the tyres.

Sprint Race
Jérôme d'Ambrosio repeated Sergio Pérez's earlier feat by winning his first GP2 race in the Sprint Race at Monaco. The Renault Junior Team driver led all the way from pole, but his early efforts to build a lead were dashed when Coloni's Alberto Valerio and Arden's Rodolfo González crashed simultaneously at different parts of the circuit and prompted a safety car. That brought D'Ambrosio back within range of Giedo van der Garde, and he had the Addax car in his mirrors for virtually the rest of the race, finally crossing the line just 0.3 seconds clear. There was a lot of scrapping behind them for third place, which eventually went to ART's Jules Bianchi after a determined drive and a couple of brave passing moves. Rapax's Luiz Razia had been on target for the final podium place for most of the race, but after seeing off an early challenge from Valerio (which ended with Valerio hitting the wall at the chicane), he soon found himself under pressure from Bianchi. The Frenchman eventually found a way past, while Razia lost another spot when he made a mistake on the penultimate lap and allowed Trident's Johnny Cecotto to slip past into fourth. Race 1 winner Sergio Pérez took the final point for sixth. Much like the Grand Prix would be, the race had many incidents, starting with Dani Clos ripping a wheel off on the barriers on lap nine and ending Racing Engineering's interest in the afternoon, with Christian Vietoris having failed to make the start due to an engine problem. There was also a number of drivethrough penalties, with the victims including Pastor Maldonado and Rodriguez for a jump start and Oliver Turvey, Davide Valsecchi, and Fabio Leimer for cutting the first corner at the start. Sam Bird got the point for fastest lap.

Classification

Qualifying

1. - Davide Valsecchi received a five-place grid penalty because of causing accident with Pastor Maldonado in qualifying.

Feature Race

1. - Sam Bird received a 25-seconds penalty because of cutting the chicane.

Sprint Race

Standings after the round

Drivers' Championship standings

Teams' Championship standings

 Note: Only the top five positions are included for both sets of standings.

References

External links
 GP2 Series official web site: Results

Monaco
GP2
Motorsport in Monaco